William Knollys may refer to:
 William Knollys, 1st Earl of Banbury (1544–1632), English nobleman
 William Knollys (Oxfordshire MP, died 1664), MP for Oxfordshire, 1663–1664
 William Knollys (Banbury MP) (1694–1740), MP for Banbury, 1733–40, who claimed the courtesy title of Viscount Wallingford
 Sir William Knollys (British Army officer) (1797–1883), British general and courtier

See also 
 Knollys family